The Weatherly Area School District is a public school district in Carbon County, Pennsylvania. It is centered on Weatherly and also serves the borough of East Side, plus Lehigh, Packer, Lausanne, and northern Kidder Townships. The district features one elementary school, one middle school, and one high school.

Athletics 
The school offers soccer, cross country, golf, and volleyball in the Fall.  In the Winter students can play basketball. In the Spring students can play baseball, softball, or track and Field.

External links 

 Weatherly School District Homepage

School districts in Carbon County, Pennsylvania